Line 2 (Italian: Linea 2) is a rapid transit service operated by Trenitalia in the city of Naples, Italy. It connects 12 stations.

Line 2 operates on the urban railway, which crosses the city of Naples from west to east. All regional trains, differently from metropolitan trains, are received by Campi Flegrei station in different platforms.

Line 2 also has some minor regional extensions. These are the Naples-Caserta and Naples-Salerno (all these services use the Passante rapid transit railway, of which the latter two start from Campi Flegrei station).

History 
The construction of the line, part of the ″direttissima″ Rome–Naples, was begun in 1911 and after a suspension during World War I, it was completed in 1925 between Pozzuoli and Piazza Garibaldi, electrified with third rail. Two years later the ″direttissima″ was completed, and the electrical rail service was extended towards Villa Literno and San Giovanni-Barra.

In November 1935 the line was also electrified with overhead line; the third rail was discontinued in 1938.

In 1997, the line was numbered as Line 2, while the other Naples Metro line became Line 1. The two lines were connected with a pedestrian tunnel between Museo and Cavour in 2002 and in Garibaldi station in 2012

In 2001, operation of the line was taken over by Metronapoli SpA, a newly established joint stock company in which Trenitalia held a 38% stake. However, in November 2005, operation of line 2 was transferred back to Trenitalia, and that company sold its Metronapoli shares to the municipal government.

Since 2009, the line is crossed only by metropolitan trains.

Rolling stock 
The metropolitan service started in 1925 with third rail cars of type E.20 transferred from the Ferrovie Varesine.

In 1938 the third rail system was discontinued, and the E.20 substituted by the newer E.624 equipped with overhead line.

From 1962–63 the E.624 were moved and substituted by the new EMUs of type ALe 803, and from 1983 the ALe 724.

Line 2 also uses ALe 582 and the newest double-decker Treno ad alta frequentazione and Jazz trains.

Stations

See also 
 Naples Metro
 List of suburban and commuter rail systems

References

Bibliography 
Cornolò, Giovanni (1994). Locomotive elettriche FS. Ermanno Albertelli Editore. .
Cornolò, Giovanni (2011). Automotrici elettriche dalle origini al 1983. Duegi. .

External links 

 Trenitalia - Metropolitana di Napoli linea 2 
 Urbanrail.net Naples rail website

Transport in Naples
Underground commuter rail